Kaneh Rashid-e Allah Feqid (also Romanized as Kaneh Rashīd-e Allah Feqīd; also known as ‘Ālgeh, ‘Ālgeh Faqīh, and Kaneh Rashīd-e Algah) is a village in Gurani Rural District, Gahvareh District, Dalahu County, Kermanshah Province, Iran. At the 2006 census, its population was 61, in 13 families.

References 

Populated places in Dalahu County